Thomas Grant (20 December 1879 – 1934) was an Australian cricketer. He played one first-class cricket match for Victoria in 1907.

See also
 List of Victoria first-class cricketers

References

External links
 

1879 births
1934 deaths
Australian cricketers
Victoria cricketers
Cricketers from Melbourne